William J. Williams may refer to:

William Joseph Williams (1759–1823), American painter
William John Williams (born 1960), English footballer and sports commentator
William J. McWilliams, from Secretary of State of Maryland in 1956
William J. Williams, elected in the Alberta general election, 1944 under the Veterans' and Active Force party banner

See also
William Williams (disambiguation)